The Naked Women's Wrestling League, also known as NWWL, was an erotic women's professional wrestling promotion which featured nude females battling in the ring. Carmen Electra acted as hostess for the organization until 2007, when she sued the company for breach of contract. The NWWL broadcast shows around the world, and its wrestlers were featured in magazines such as Penthouse, Playboy, and Maxim.

History
Before creating the Naked Women's Wrestling League, the creators tried other products that featured naked women, such as online gambling, before settling on nude female wrestling.

The NWWL wrestlers were trained by Ron Hutchison. The show made its debut in 2004 with the release of the pay-per-view show "Vegas Stripped". It returned to pay-per-view in 2006, with the "Naked Revolution" show. Carmen Electra hosted the show, while other celebrities to appear on the program included pro-wrestling manager Jimmy "Mouth of the South" Hart, as well as adult entertainment star Mary Carey. Pay-per-views feature female wrestlers wrestling both clothed and in the nude.

In November 2007, Electra announced a lawsuit against the NWWL for, among other things, breach of contract and failure to pay money that she claimed was still due to her. In response, NWWL owner Howard Mann revealed that he would seek damages for defamation, slander and malicious persecution.

In late 2007, the NWWL launched a website where their nude wrestling matches were available for download. Since the promotion debuted, the NWWL shows have been broadcast in approximately 38 countries. In addition, the wrestlers have been featured in Penthouse, Playboy, and Maxim.

Roster
Angel of Desire
Annie Social
April Hunter
Becky Brady
Carmen Electra (hostess)
Cleopatra
Cruella
Dark Angel
Demonica Disco
Flexi Lexi (referee at matches in Milwaukee Harley 105th)
Harriet Bush
Josianne the Pussycat
Kandi Smyth
Kylie Electra
Lady Serpentine 
Layla Hussein
Mandy Weaver
Megan Summers (co-host)
Melissa Coates
Miss Bunny 
Ninja Chops
Princess of Pain 
Samantha Sixx
Selena Sanchez
Spitney Beers
Tiny Tina
Trish the Dish
Twin Peaks
Wicca St. James
Christine Gunn
Lynsey Young

DVDs
Carmen Electra's NWWL, Vol. 1: Bush vs Hussein
Carmen Electra's NWWL, Vol. 2: Tag Team Dream
Carmen Electra's NWWL, Vol. 3: Championship Match

References

External links

American professional wrestling promotions
Women's professional wrestling promotions
Adult entertainment companies